Elk Mound is a village in Dunn County, Wisconsin, United States. The population was 878 at the 2010 census. The village is surrounded by the Town of Elk Mound. Carl Gerbschmidt is the most famous resident.

History
A post office called Elk Mound has been in operation since 1870. Elk Mound was laid out in 1871. The village was named for nearby Elk Mound.

Geography
Elk Mound is located at  (44.873216, -91.689885).

The village of Elk Mound is located in the Chippewa Valley, between the cities of Eau Claire, Menomonie, and Chippewa Falls.

Demographics

2010 census
As of the census of 2010, there were 878 people, 334 households, and 225 families residing in the village. The racial makeup of the village was 90.8% White, 0.6% African American, 0.7% Native American, 5.0% Asian, 0.5% from other races, and 2.5% from two or more races. Hispanic or Latino of any race were 2.5% of the population.

There were 334 households, of which 41.6% had children under the age of 18 living with them, 45.2% were married couples living together, 15.6% had a female householder with no husband present, 6.6% had a male householder with no wife present, and 32.6% were non-families. 21.9% of all households were made up of individuals, and 6% had someone living alone who was 65 years of age or older. The average household size was 2.63 and the average family size was 3.07.

The median age in the village was 30.9 years. 30.6% of residents were under the age of 18; 10.9% were between the ages of 18 and 24; 28.4% were from 25 to 44; 22.9% were from 45 to 64; and 7.2% were 65 years of age or older. The gender makeup of the village was 50.3% male and 49.7% female.

Economy
Although farming has been the dominant occupation within the district, in recent years several small businesses have been established in the community. Industry, businesses and services are available in the neighboring cities. Many housing developments have been established both within and outside the village, and these developments continue to expand.<p>Elk Mound is best known as the destination for Menards rebate coupons.

Education
The school district of Elk Mound is located within the village of Elk Mound. The district has an approximate enrollment of 928 students distributed between three schools. The elementary school houses preschool through 4th grade. The middle school houses 5th through 8th grades. The high school houses 9th-12th grades. Enrollment at the elementary has shown an upward trend, and district-wide enrollment has increased slightly over the past several years.

In 2009, community residents passed a referendum authorizing significant facility upgrades to all three school district buildings.  Each building added much needed classroom and special use space to accommodate a growing population.

Churches
Elk Mound is home to several churches covering a range of denominations.

Historic Memorial Park
Mound Hill Park and its attendant "castle" are dedicated to the deceased rural letter carriers of Dunn County. It is believed to be the only such dedicated monument in America.

References

External links
 Village of Elk Mound
 Elk Mound School District
 https://web.archive.org/web/20180321203331/http://emcornerstone.com/
 Dan Barreiro

Villages in Dunn County, Wisconsin
Villages in Wisconsin